Jajjah Abbasiyan is a town and union council in Khan Pur Katora, Rahim Yar Khan District in Bahawalpur Division of Punjab, Pakistan. According to the census of 1998, the city population was 40778 with an annual growth rate of 2.6%. 
The city is agriculturally strong and very important in Pakistan;produces high quality dates and mangoes economically.

Rahim Yar Khan District
Populated places in Rahim Yar Khan District